St John's Church, Letty Green,  is a  deconsecrated Gothic Revival church in Letty Green, Hertfordshire, England.

The building was designed by George Fowler Jones. It was given a heritage listing (Grade II) in the 1960s.
It went on the market in 2001 with planning permission for conversion to residential use. It has since been converted.

References

External links

Letty Green
Gothic Revival architecture in Hertfordshire
Letty Green